The Presidential Medal of Merit  (Pampanguluhang Medalya ng Merito) is an honor given by the Republic of the Philippines.

History 
The Presidential Merit Award was renamed the Presidential Medal of Merit by Executive Order 236 on September 19, 2003.

Award 
The Presidential Medal of Merit shall be conferred upon an individual, Filipino or foreign:

Recipients 

Rosa Sevilla, 1948
Aurora Quezon, 1949 (posthumous)
Carlos P. Romulo, 1949
Carmen de Luna, 1949, for her contributions to youth and education
Francisca Tirona-Benitez, 1949
María Orosa, 1949 (posthumous)
Jaime De Veyra, 1950
Rebecca Parrish, 1950
Sergio Osmeña, 1950
Elpidio Quirino, 1955
Emilio Aguinaldo, 1955
Juan Nakpil, 1955
Engracia Cruz-Reyes, 1955
Trinidad Fernandez-Legarda, 1966
Josefa Edralin-Marcos, 1966 
Amado T. Del Rosario, 1970 
Guillermo Tolentino, 1970
Vicente Madrigal, 1970
 Scout Oscar M. Alcaraz, 1970 (posthumous)
International Rice Research Institute, 1972
Manuel Elizalde, 1972
Kenneth Lee Pike, 1974
Herbert W. Armstrong, 1983
Gabriel Elorde, 1984
Paeng Nepomuceno, 1984
 Ossie Mills, 1987
Lea Salonga, 1990
Cecile Licad, 1991
Maniya Barredo, 1994
Haydee Yorac, 1997
Teresita de Castro, 1998
Armand Fabella, 1998
Hermogenes Esperon, 1998
Edelmiro Amante, 1998
Emilio Osmeña, 1998
Epimaco Velasco, 1998
Franklin Drilon, 1998
Leonardo Quisumbing, 1998
Victor Sumulong, 1998
Ramon Montaño, 1998
Jang Young-sik, 1998
Jesus Dureza, 1998
Philip Watts, 2001
Robert A. Underwood, 2002
Manny Pacquiao, 2003
Dr. Josette Biyo, 2003
René van der Linden, 2005
Abdulmari Imao, 2005
Alexander Magno, 2005
Alfonso Yuchengco, 2005
Andres Bautista, 2005
Carmen Pedrosa, 2005
Efraim Tendero, 2005
Gilberto Duavit Sr., 2005
Mel Senen Sarmiento, 2005
Oscar Rodriguez, 2005
Pablo Garcia, 2005
Pedro Romualdo, 2005
Raul Lambino, 2005
René Azurin, 2005
Sergio Apostol, 2005
Vicente Paterno, 2005
Anita Magsaysay-Ho, 2006
Fernando Zóbel de Ayala y Montojo, 2006 (posthumous)
Juvenal Sanso, 2006
Nena Saguil, 2006 (posthumous)
Oscar Yatco, 2006
Romeo Tabuena, 2006
 apl.de.ap, 2006
 will.i.am, 2006
Benjamin Cayetano, 2006
Linda Lingle, 2006
Francisco Bustamante, 2006
 Monique Lhuillier, 2006
Federico Alcuaz, 2006
Manuel Conde, 2006 (posthumous)
Malang, 2006 
Alfonso Cusi, 2007
Antonio Cuenco, 2007
Nerissa Soon-Ruiz, 2007
Raul del Mar, 2007
Thadeo Ouano, 2007
Tomas Osmeña, 2007
Juan Ignacio Pérez Iglesias, 2007
 Reverend Fr. Eduardo Hontiveros, SJ, 2008 (posthumous)
 Francis Magalona, 2009 (posthumous)
 Jaime Augusto Zóbel de Ayala II, 2009
 Leland Yee, 2010
 Lilia de Lima, 2010
 Ambeth Ocampo, 2013
 Peter Irving Corvera, 2016
 Arnel Paciano D. Casanova, 2016
 Araceli Limcaco–Dans, 2018
 Hidilyn Diaz, 2021

References 

 1
Presidential Medal of Merit
Establishments by Philippine executive order